Pinar Heggernes (born 1969) is a Turkish-born Norwegian computer scientist known for her research on graph algorithms, sparse matrix computations, and parameterized complexity. She is the deputy rector of the University of Bergen, elected together with rector Margareth Hagen for the period 2021 - 2025. Until August 2021, she was the head of the Department of Informatics at the University of Bergen. She is also a member of the board of directors of the Research Council of Norway, appointed for the period 2019-2022.

Education and career
Heggernes was born in 1969 in Istanbul.
She was educated at the University of Bergen, earning bachelor's and master's degrees there in 1990 and 1992,
and completing her Ph.D. there in 1996. Her dissertation, Partitioning and Ordering Graphs for Sparse Matrix Computations, was supervised by Bengt Aspvall.

After working at a research laboratory in Norway, and then as a postdoctoral researcher at the University of Bergen, she became a faculty member in informatics in 2001, and head of the department in 2018. She has also been a visiting professor at the University of Oregon, at Boğaziçi University in Istanbul, and at the University of Primorska in Slovenia. In 2021, she was elected  deputy rector of the University of Bergen.

Recognition
Heggernes was elected to the Norwegian Academy of Technological Sciences in 2014.

Personal
Heggernes is also an amateur competitor in outdoor running events.

References

Further reading

External links
Home page
Ten Feet Tall, Heggernes's blog on running

1969 births
Living people
Norwegian computer scientists
Turkish women computer scientists
Turkish computer scientists
University of Bergen alumni
Academic staff of the University of Bergen